Helmut Herbert Christian Heinrich Knochen (March 14, 1910 – April 4, 2003) was the senior commander of the Sicherheitspolizei (Security Police) and Sicherheitsdienst in Paris during the Nazi occupation of France during World War II. He was sentenced to death first by a British military court in 1947, and then by a Parisian military tribunal in 1954. After his sentences were commuted and reduced a few times, he was pardoned by President de Gaulle and released in 1962.

Early life 
He was born in Magdeburg, Germany. Before joining the Nazi Party in 1932, he worked as a teacher and editor.

Nazi career 
In 1936, he joined the SS and became involved in the SD administration. In 1940, he was appointed the senior commander of security in Paris. In 1942, the jurisdiction under his control stretched from northern France to Belgium. He was promoted to the rank of Standartenführer in the same year. Knochen was involved in the deportation of French Jews to concentration camps and was responsible for the execution of thousands of Frenchmen. He was responsible for the arrest and torture of SOE agents.

During the plot to assassinate Hitler of July 20, 1944, together with the top security man in Paris, SS-Gruppenführer Carl Oberg, he was arrested by Army troops under the command of Paris military governor, General Carl-Heinrich von Stülpnagel. He was released after the coup collapsed. Following the liberation of Paris, Knochen was transferred to the 1st SS Division Leibstandarte SS Adolf Hitler and he was degraded to the rank of SS-Grenadier.

Post-war trials, sentences, and reprieve 
In March 1947, a British Military Court sentenced Knochen, alongside Hans Kieffer, to death for the murder of a number of British parachute troops on or around 9 August 1944. However, on 16 September 1948, the sentence was commuted to life imprisonment, and further commuted in February 1950 to 21 years imprisonment. He was extradited to France in 1954 and sentenced to death. The sentence was later commuted to life imprisonment. After he obtained a presidential pardon in 1958, Knochen was released on November 28, 1962, by President Charles de Gaulle, simultaneously with his former chief Carl Oberg. Back in Germany, he retired to Baden-Baden and died a free man in 2003.

In popular culture
 The Eye of Vichy, a French documentary film directed by Claude Chabrol where Knochen himself appeared
 Les Bienveillantes, a 2006 historical fiction novel written in French by Jonathan Littell, where Helmut Knochen is featured meeting the main character Maximilian Aue.
 Field Gray, a 2010 fiction novel by Philip Kerr where Knochen featured.

Notes

References 
 
 
  Brunner, Bernhard, Der Frankreich-Komplex. Die nationalsozialistischen Verbrechen in Frankreich und die Justiz der Bundesrepublik Deutschland. Wallstein, Göttingen 2004, 
  Klee, Ernst, Das Personenlexikon zum Dritten Reich. Wer war was vor und nach 1945. Fischer Taschenbuch Verlag, Zweite aktualisierte Auflage, Frankfurt am Main 2005, S. 320.
  Moisel, Claudia, La France et les criminels de guerre allemands. Politique et pratique de la poursuite pénale après la deuxième guerre mondiale, Éd. Norbert, 2004, .
 
  Magazine Historia, N° 337, décembre 1974 par Philippe Aziz.
  Magazine Historia, Hors Série N° 20, 1971, Les SS. 1 - L'ordre noir.
  Magazine Historia, Hors Série N° 26, 1972, par Serge Klarsfeld.
  Magazine Historia, Hors Série N° 27, 1972, La Gestapo en France. 2.
 L'oeil de Vichy, (The Eyes of Vichy), documentary film directed by Claude Chabrol, 
  Delarue, Jacques, SS et Gestapo s'imposent à la Wehrmacht, in Le Journal de la France de l'occupation à la libération, les années 40, Historia-Tallandier, n° 47, p. 1289-1290.

External links
 Jewish Virtual Library
  Bibliothèque virtuelle juive du nazi Helmut Knochen
  ARTE-Interview 2004
  Celui qui parle d'Europol, ne peut pas oublier le RSHA
  une interview auto-réparatrice trois ans avant sa mort

1910 births
2003 deaths
SS-Standartenführer
Military personnel from Magdeburg
Holocaust perpetrators in France
Nazi Party officials
People from the Province of Saxony
People of Vichy France
People extradited to France
Prisoners sentenced to death by the British military
Prisoners sentenced to death by France
Recipients of French presidential pardons
German people imprisoned abroad
German prisoners sentenced to death
People extradited from the United Kingdom
Reich Security Main Office personnel
Waffen-SS personnel